Buda-Kashalyova District, Buda-Kašaliouski Rajon is a district of Gomel Region, in Belarus.

Places of interest 

Biological reserve "Buda-Kašaloǔski on the Dnieper lowland

References

 
Districts of Gomel Region